Geniostoma quadrangulare is a species of plant in the Loganiaceae family. It is endemic to French Polynesia.

References

Flora of French Polynesia
quadrangulare
Least concern plants
Taxonomy articles created by Polbot